Philippa Mary Nikulinsky  (born 1942) is an artist and botanical illustrator based in Western Australia.

Biography
Nikulinsky was born in Kalgoorlie in 1942, a remote region in central Western Australia. She began working as an illustrator of natural history in the mid 1970s, specialising in plants from harsh environments. Her illustrations have been included in many books and magazines. She is the author or coauthor of books on plants, animals, and their environment. Other works include the cover art for Landscope, scientific journals, and other publications.

Nikulinsky’s career focuses on a lifetime fascination with the flora and fauna of the arid lands of Western Australia. For nearly 50 years Philippa has travelled throughout this enormous state to record, draw and paint its phenomenal natural history. She has shared her gift for watercolour painting through teaching, exhibitions, commissioned works and publications.

Nikulinsky has made contributions to Flora of Australia. She is the author of a work on Banksia menziesii (Firewood Banksia), provided illustrations and text to Life on the Rocks (with Stephen Hopper), and a large format art book called Soul of the Desert. Many of her works include several organisms, illustrating the ecological relationships of the primary subject, and are noted for possessing high levels of detail while still maintaining a sense of spontaneity. As with other botanical illustrators, she works primarily in watercolour.

In 2011 Her Majesty, Queen Elizabeth II and the Duke of Edinburgh visited Perth for the meeting of Commonwealth Heads of Government (CHOGM). During the visit, the Premier of Western Australia presented the Queen with a gift of Philippa’s limited edition publication ‘Wildflowers of the Eastern Goldfields of Western Australia’ on behalf of the State government and the people of Western Australia.

Her latest collection of work, Cape Arid includes paintings by her husband Alex Nikulinsky and is held at the world-renowned COMO The Treasury Hotel in Perth. In 2016, Prince Charles opened the hotel and was presented with a work from the series.

On 26 January 2016 Nikulisnky was awarded Member (AM) in the general division of the Order of Australia, "for significant service to the visual arts as a botanical painter and illustrator, to professional associations, and as an author."

Ceramics 
From 1995 to 2005 Nikulinsky was commissioned to design and paint Australian plants and animals for use on dinnerware produced by Australian Fine China. These were sold throughout the world.

Works 
From 1990 to 2006 Nikulinsky painted the cover illustration of the quarterly magazine ‘Landscope’ for the Western Australian Department of Conservation and Land Management. In 2004 Philippa was commissioned to paint leschenaultia for the May 2004 edition of ‘Curtis’, the magazine produced by the Kew Gardens in the United Kingdom.

Nikulinsky has been praised for her work on Banksia menziesii, describing each stage of the reproductive cycle. The inflorescence of banksias is regarded as one of the most challenging subjects to depict. The brief text is accompanied by a series of extraordinary illustrations, both endpapers showing a seed of the species.
 Flowering Plants of the Eastern Goldfields of Western Australia: Goldfields of Western Australia. (1986) International Specialized Book Services. 
 BANKSIA MENZIESII (1992) Philippa Nikulinsky. Fremantle Arts Centre Press. .
 Life on the Rocks: The Art of Survival (1999) Philippa Nikulinsky and Stephen D. Hopper. Fremantle Arts Centre Press .
 Wildflowers in WatercolourPhilippa Nikulinsky. Fremantle Arts Centre Press (November 2000) .
 1999 Australian Wildflower Diary (2000). Philippa Nikulinsky. International Specialized Book Services. .
 Soul of the Desert (2000) Philippa Nikulinsky and Stephen D. Hopper. Fremantle Arts Centre Press (October 2005). 
 Cape Arid (2012) Philippa and Alex Nikulinsky. Fremantle Press.

References

See also
 List of Australian botanical illustrators

1942 births
Living people
Botanical illustrators
People from Kalgoorlie
Members of the Order of Australia
Artists from Western Australia
20th-century Australian women artists
21st-century Australian women artists